Adventures in Solitude: What Not to Wear to a Nude Potluck and Other Stories from Desolation Sound is a non-fiction book by musician and broadcaster Grant Lawrence, first published in October 2010 by Harbour Publishing. In the book, the author chronicles his upbringing, focusing on annual summer vacations spent on a land parcel his father had purchased in the 1970s on British Columbia's Desolation Sound.

Awards and honours
Adventures in Solitude received the Bill Duthie Booksellers' Choice Award in April 2011, for the "best book published in British Columbia in the previous calendar year." The book was also shortlisted for the 2011's Hilary Weston Writers' Trust Prize for Nonfiction and for the 2011 Edna Staebler Award for Creative Non-Fiction.

References

External links
Grant Lawrence, Home page, Retrieved 11/23/2012

Canadian non-fiction books
2010 non-fiction books
Canadian memoirs